Beverley Bland Munford (September 10, 1856 – May 31, 1910) was an American lawyer, politician, social reformer, speaker, and author in Richmond, Virginia. He served eight years in the Virginia House of Delegates and four years in the Virginia Senate. He wrote a book about the causes of the American Civil War.

Early life and family

Childhood and education
Beverley Bland Munford was the son of Colonel John Dunborrow Munford and the grandson of William Munford, author of "Munford's Reports" and a translator of Homer's Illiad. Beverley Bland Munford's childhood was spent on a farm near Williamsburg.

He entered the College of William and Mary in 1873 and graduated in 1877. At the age of nineteen he accepted a clerkship in the office of Judge J. D. Coles, going on to complete his study of the law at the University of Virginia under John B. Minor. After being admitted to the bar, he began his practice by opening an office at Pittsylvania Courthouse.

Marriage
On November 22, 1893, Munford married activist and educational reformer Mary-Cooke Branch Munford. Their marriage was affectionate and congenial. They loved books and music and were described by nephew Walter Russell Bowie as sharing liberal and forward-looking impulses. They had a daughter Mary Safford, born 1895 and a son, Beverly Bland Munford Jr., born 1899. His grandson, B. B. Munford III, was an executive at the Richmond investment firm Davenport & Co.

Career
Beverley Munford was a member of the Richmond Education Association which Mary-Cooke Munford help found. He served as a member of the board of visitors of the College of William and Mary and of the Hampton Normal School. Munford served on the board of directors of the Virginia Historical Society and was a vestryman at St. Paul's Episcopal Church.

He was a partner with Waller Redd Staples at the law firm Staples & Munford. At the time of his death he was a senior member with Munford, Hunton, Williams and Anderson.

After a long illness, Munford died at his home in Henrico County, Virginia. He was buried in Hollywood Cemetery.

Extant documents include a letter he wrote to John Allen Watts June 18, 1874 about his commencement speaking engagements and activities at Fincastle. James Branch Cabell's From the Hidden Way was dedicated to Munford.

Bibliography
Virginia's attitude toward slavery and secession by Beverley B. Munford,  50 editions published between 1909 and 2013.
Random recollections by Beverley B. Munford (1905)
Address of B.B. Munford before the Euzelian and Euepian Societies at Hollins Institute, June 16, 1886 by Beverley B Munford
"Our times and the men for the times"; address of Beverley B. Munford before the Association of the Alumni of the College of William and Mary, on the occasion of the one hundred and ninety-fifth commencement exercises, July 4, 1889 by Beverley B Munford

References

1856 births
1910 deaths
Virginia state senators
Members of the Virginia House of Delegates
Virginia lawyers
20th-century American lawyers
19th-century American lawyers
College of William & Mary alumni
20th-century American male writers
Historians of the American Civil War
Writers from Richmond, Virginia
20th-century American historians
Politicians from Richmond, Virginia
Historians from Virginia